John Shannon Hendrix (born 1959) is an architectural historian and philosopher who has written and lectured extensively on the subjects of architecture, art, philosophy, aesthetics, psychoanalysis, science, culture and history.  Much of his work focuses on connections among those topics, such as interactions of vision, perception, and sensation with the arts and architecture, the relationships between psychoanalysis and architecture, physical sciences and architecture, and philosophy and architecture.  His career focuses on research and writing about "mostly European precedents in architecture and philosophy, for the purpose of suggesting alternatives to the practice of architecture and philosophy at the beginning of the twenty-first century."

He has taught at Roger Williams University since 1999. He was Professor of Architectural History at the University of Lincoln, Lincoln, England from 2007 through 2015, Lecturer, History of Art and Visual Culture at the Rhode Island School of Design from 2004 through 2010, and has been lecturer at John Cabot University in Rome, the University of Connecticut, Rhode Island College, and the University of Massachusetts Lowell. He earned his B.F.A. in painting at the Art Institute of Chicago, M.A. at the Rhode Island School of Design, M.Arch. at the University of Illinois at Chicago, and a Ph.D. in architecture at Cornell University.

Research and Theory

Hendrix's research and theoretical focus is directed toward developing modern alternatives to conventional practice of architecture and philosophy.  Proposing approaches to contemporary practice of art and architecture, his teachings and writings relate interdisciplinary disciplines including aesthetics, cosmology, philosophy, and psychoanalysis.

Connecting concepts of justice with the symbolic nature of architecture, Hendrix has analyzed how medieval cathedrals' use of  light provide symbolism of justice.

Developing new directions in urban planning based on psychoanalytic theory, Hendrix is a member of an international research group, based at Oxford Brookes University, designated "Architecture on the Couch: Psychoanalysis and the Environment."

To explore interdependencies among ancient and medieval philosophies and medieval architecture, Hendrix has been scheduled as a keynote speaker at the 2018 Fundamental Structures conference at Durham University.

Books

References

External links
 
 

1959 births
20th-century American architects
American male non-fiction writers
American philosophers
Living people
Cornell University College of Architecture, Art, and Planning alumni
Roger Williams University faculty
Rhode Island School of Design faculty
University of Connecticut faculty
University of Massachusetts faculty
Academic staff of John Cabot University
21st-century American architects